The 2012–13 Pittsburgh Penguins season was the franchise's 46th season in the National Hockey League (NHL). The regular season was reduced from its usual 82 games to 48 due to a lockout.

Off-season
The Pittsburgh Penguins finished their 2011–12 season with 108 points, ranking second in the Atlantic Division and fourth in the Eastern Conference. Pittsburgh started off the 2012 Stanley Cup playoffs in the Eastern Conference Quarter-finals against their cross-state rivals, the Philadelphia Flyers. Pittsburgh eventually went on to lose in six games, with Philadelphia taking the series 4–2. The 45 goals scored through the first four games set an NHL record for goals in the first four games of a seven-game series. A total of 56 goals were scored over the course of the entire series.

After elimination, Pittsburgh went on to sign 2010 draft pick Reid McNeill on May 15, 2012 and 2011 draft pick Dominik Uher on June 1, 2012 to three-year entry level contracts. On June 4, 2012, the Penguins signed goaltender Tomas Vokoun to a two-year contract after acquiring him from the Washington Capitals for a seventh-round draft pick in 2012. On June 28, 2012, the Penguins agreed to terms with All-Star center Sidney Crosby to a 12-year contract extension worth $104.4 million, but due to the terms of the current NHL Collective Bargaining Agreement, the new deal could not be signed until July 1, 2012.

Lockout

At 11:59 p.m. (EDT) on September 15, 2012, following the expiration of the NHL collective bargaining agreement (CBA) the owners declared a lockout of the members of the National Hockey League Players' Association (NHLPA) until a new agreement could be reached. As a result, training camps will not open until agreement on a new CBA is reached.

Cancellation announcements
On September 19, 2012 the NHL announced the cancellation of pre-season games through September 30, 2012 
On September 27, 2012 the NHL announced the cancellation of the remaining pre-season games. 
On October 4, 2012 the NHL announced the cancellation of regular season games through October 24, 2012. 
On October 18, 2012 the NHL announced the cancellation of regular season games through November 1, 2012.
On October 26, 2012 the NHL announced the cancellation of regular season games through November 30, 2012.
On November 2, 2012 the NHL announced the cancellation of the 2013 Bridgestone Winter Classic between the Detroit Red Wings and the Toronto Maple Leafs scheduled for January 1, 2013. The NHL also announced the cancellation of all events at the SiriusXM Hockeytown Winter Festival scheduled for December 16–31, 2012 at Comerica Park in Detroit.
On November 23, 2012 the NHL announced the cancellation of regular season games through December 14, 2012 and announced the cancellation of the 2013 NHL All-Star weekend schedule for January 26–27, 2013 in Columbus, Ohio.
On December 10, 2012 the NHL announced the cancellation of regular season games through December 30, 2012.
On December 20, 2012 the NHL announced the cancellation of regular season games through January 14, 2013.

|- style="text-align:center;"
| 1 || Sep 24 || 7:00 pm || Pittsburgh Penguins || Cancelled || Columbus Blue Jackets || Nationwide Arena || 0-0-0 || N/A
|- style="text-align:center;"
| 2 || Sep 26 || 7:00 pm || Detroit Red Wings || Cancelled || Pittsburgh Penguins || Consol Energy Center || 0-0-0 || N/A
|- style="text-align:center;"
| 3 || Sep 29 || 3:00 pm || Columbus Blue Jackets || Cancelled || Pittsburgh Penguins || Consol Energy Center || 0-0-0 || N/A
|- style="text-align:center;"
| 4 || Sep 30 || 7:00 pm || Pittsburgh Penguins || Cancelled || Chicago Blackhawks || United Center || 0-0-0 || N/A
|- style="text-align:center;"
| 5 || Oct 3 || 7:00 pm || Pittsburgh Penguins || Cancelled || Detroit Red Wings || Joe Louis Arena || 0-0-0 || N/A
|- style="text-align:center;"
| 6 || Oct 5 || 7:00 pm || Chicago Blackhawks || Cancelled || Pittsburgh Penguins || Consol Energy Center || 0-0-0 || N/A
|-

|- style="text-align:center;"
| 1 || 12 || 7:00 pm || New York Islanders || Cancelled || Pittsburgh Penguins || Consol Energy Center ||  ||  
|- style="text-align:center;"
| 2 || 13 || 7:00 pm || Pittsburgh Penguins || Cancelled || Buffalo Sabres || First Niagara Center ||  ||  
|- style="text-align:center;"
| 3 || 16 || 7:00 pm || Ottawa Senators || Cancelled || Pittsburgh Penguins || Consol Energy Center ||  ||  
|- style="text-align:center;"
| 4 || 18 || 7:00 pm || Pittsburgh Penguins || Cancelled || Philadelphia Flyers || Wells Fargo Center ||  ||  
|- style="text-align:center;"
| 5 || 20 || 8:00 pm || Pittsburgh Penguins || Cancelled || Nashville Predators || Bridgestone Arena ||  ||  
|- style="text-align:center;"
| 6 || 23 || 7:00 pm || Vancouver Canucks || Cancelled || Pittsburgh Penguins || Consol Energy Center ||  ||  
|- style="text-align:center;"
| 7 || 25 || 7:00 pm || New York Rangers || Cancelled || Pittsburgh Penguins || Consol Energy Center ||  ||  
|- style="text-align:center;"
| 8 || 26 || 7:30 pm || Pittsburgh Penguins || Cancelled || Ottawa Senators || Scotiabank Place ||  ||  
|- style="text-align:center;"
| 9 || 31 || 7:30 pm || Pittsburgh Penguins || Cancelled || Washington Capitals || Verizon Center ||  ||  
|-

|- style="text-align:center;"
| 10 || 2 || 7:00 pm || Pittsburgh Penguins || Cancelled || Columbus Blue Jackets || Nationwide Arena ||  ||  
|- style="text-align:center;"
| 11 || 3 || 7:00 pm || Pittsburgh Penguins || Cancelled || New Jersey Devils || Prudential Center ||  ||  
|- style="text-align:center;"
| 12 || 5 || 8:30 pm || Pittsburgh Penguins || Cancelled || Chicago Blackhawks || United Center ||  ||  
|- style="text-align:center;"
| 13 || 7 || 7:30 pm || Pittsburgh Penguins || Cancelled || Toronto Maple Leafs || Air Canada Centre ||  ||  
|- style="text-align:center;
| 14 || 10 || 1:00 pm || Edmonton Oilers || Cancelled || Pittsburgh Penguins || Consol Energy Center ||  ||  
|- style="text-align:center;"
| 15 || 13 || 7:00 pm || Colorado Avalanche || Cancelled || Pittsburgh Penguins || Consol Energy Center ||  ||  
|- style="text-align:center;"
| 16 || 15 || 7:00 pm || Toronto Maple Leafs || Cancelled || Pittsburgh Penguins || Consol Energy Center ||  ||  
|- style="text-align:center;"
| 17 || 16 || 7:30 pm || Pittsburgh Penguins || Cancelled || Ottawa Senators || Scotiabank Place ||  ||  
|- style="text-align:center;"
| 18 || 19 || 7:30 pm || Pittsburgh Penguins || Cancelled || Detroit Red Wings || Joe Louis Arena ||  ||  
|- style="text-align:center;"
| 19 || 21 || 7:00 pm || New Jersey Devils || Cancelled || Pittsburgh Penguins || Consol Energy Center ||  ||  
|- style="text-align:center;"
| 20 || 23 || 7:00 pm || Carolina Hurricanes || Cancelled || Pittsburgh Penguins || Consol Energy Center ||  ||  
|- style="text-align:center;"
| 21 || 24 || 7:00 pm || Pittsburgh Penguins || Cancelled || Boston Bruins || TD Garden ||  ||  
|- style="text-align:center;"
| 22 || 26 || 7:00 pm || Minnesota Wild || Cancelled || Pittsburgh Penguins || Consol Energy Center ||  ||  
|- style="text-align:center;"
| 23 || 29 || 7:00 pm || San Jose Sharks || Cancelled || Pittsburgh Penguins || Consol Energy Center ||  ||  
|-

|- style="text-align:center;"
| 24 || 1 || 2:00 pm || Pittsburgh Penguins || Cancelled || Dallas Stars || American Airlines Center ||  ||  
|- style="text-align:center;"
| 25 || 4 || 7:00 pm || Carolina Hurricanes || Cancelled || Pittsburgh Penguins || Consol Energy Center ||  ||  
|- style="text-align:center;"
| 26 || 6 || 7:00 pm || St. Louis Blues || Cancelled || Pittsburgh Penguins || Consol Energy Center ||  ||  
|- style="text-align:center;"
| 27 || 8 || 7:00 pm || Pittsburgh Penguins || Cancelled || New Jersey Devils || Prudential Center ||  ||  
|- style="text-align:center;"
| 28 || 10 || 7:00 pm || Winnipeg Jets || Cancelled || Pittsburgh Penguins || Consol Energy Center ||  ||  
|- style="text-align:center;"
| 29 || 11 || 7:00 pm || Pittsburgh Penguins || Cancelled || Washington Capitals || Verizon Center ||  ||  
|- style="text-align:center;"
| 30 || 13 || 7:00 pm || Pittsburgh Penguins || Cancelled || Boston Bruins || TD Garden ||  ||  
|- style="text-align:center;"
| 31 || 15 || 7:00 pm || Pittsburgh Penguins || Cancelled || Winnipeg Jets || MTS Centre ||  ||  
|- style="text-align:center;"
| 32 || 17 || 7:00 pm || New Jersey Devils || Cancelled || Pittsburgh Penguins || Consol Energy Center ||  ||  
|- style="text-align:center;"
| 33 || 21 || 7:00 pm || Winnipeg Jets || Cancelled || Pittsburgh Penguins || Consol Energy Center ||  ||  
|- style="text-align:center;"
| 34 || 22 || 7:00 pm || Pittsburgh Penguins || Cancelled || New York Islanders || Nassau Coliseum ||  ||  
|- style="text-align:center;"
| 35 || 27 || 7:00 pm || Detroit Red Wings || Cancelled || Pittsburgh Penguins || Consol Energy Center ||  ||  
|- style="text-align:center;"
| 36 || 29 || 1:00 pm || Pittsburgh Penguins || Cancelled || New York Islanders || Nassau Coliseum ||  ||  
|- style="text-align:center;"
| 37 || 31 || 7:00 pm || Washington Capitals || Cancelled || Pittsburgh Penguins || Consol Energy Center ||  ||  
|-

|- style="text-align:center;"
| 38 || 4 || 7:00 pm || Florida Panthers || Cancelled || Pittsburgh Penguins || Consol Energy Center ||  ||  
|- style="text-align:center;"
| 39 || 5 || 7:00 pm || Pittsburgh Penguins || Cancelled || New Jersey Devils || Prudential Center ||  ||  
|- style="text-align:center;"
| 40 || 8 || 7:00 pm || Tampa Bay Lightning || Cancelled || Pittsburgh Penguins || Consol Energy Center ||  ||  
|- style="text-align:center;"
| 41 || 11 || 10:00 pm || Pittsburgh Penguins || Cancelled || Anaheim Ducks || Honda Center ||  ||  
|- style="text-align:center;"
| 42 || 12 || 8:00 pm || Pittsburgh Penguins || Cancelled || Phoenix Coyotes || Jobing.com Arena ||  ||  
|-

Resolution
At approximately 4:40 am EST on January 6, 2013 the NHL Commissioner Gary Bettman and NHLPA Executive Director Donald Fehr announced that they have reached an agreement on the framework of a new CBA. On January 9, 2013 the NHL Board of Governors voted unanimously to accept the new 10-year CBA between the NHL and the NHLPA, but will not become official until the NHLPA completes a ratification vote. The NHLPA announced that ratification voting would start at 8 pm (EST) Thursday (January 10, 2013) and will continue for 36 hours through Saturday (January 12, 2013) at 8 am (EST). On January 12, 2013 the NHLPA announced that the union had voted to ratify the new CBA with the NHL, but the new CBA will not become official until the NHL and the NHLPA sign a Memorandum of understanding (MOU). Later that same day both the NHL and the NHLPA announced that both sides signed the MOU reflecting the terms of the new 10-year CBA officially ending the lockout and announcing a 720-game (48 per team) regular-season schedule will begin on January 19, 2013.

Regular season

January
The Penguins released a statement from co-owners Mario Lemieux and Ron Burkle and CEO David Morehouse shortly after the NHL announced the framework agreement, offering an apology to the fans and the community and thanking them for their patience and loyalty to the team. As part of the organization thanking the fans and community for their loyalty, the Penguins organization announced that they would offer free selected concession items and "half off" all merchandise during the team's first four home games. In preparation of the start of the regular season the Penguins scheduled a free to fans "Black & Gold" game on January 16, 2013, which would simulate a game-like atmosphere with teammates facing teammates. The Penguins fans showed their appreciation to the organization by filling the CONSOL Energy Center with approximately 18,000 fans (official attendance could not be compiled without a ticket count due to the game's being open and free to the public) with the organization naming the fans as the number one star of the game. Team Black defeated Team White 5–4 in a game which simulated various scenarios (random five-on-three, four-on-four situations) including a full five-minute overtime and a shootout.

The Penguins started the season with a win over their cross-state rivals the Philadelphia Flyers that propelled Marc-Andre Fleury past Tom Barrasso to become the Penguins' all-time winning goaltender. While the Penguins went on to finish the month with four wins and three losses they did not win a game at home in the seven games in January.

February

The Penguins started February with a four-game winning streak including their first home victory of the season against the New Jersey Devils. In a game on February 3 against the Washington Capitals, Chris Kunitz set a career milestone for scoring four goals in one game and was then named NHL Second Star of the Week. With 18.7 seconds left in the second period in a game on February 13 against the Ottawa Senators, Matt Cooke went to finish a hit on Erik Karlsson when Cooke's skate blade caught Karlsson on the back of his left leg lacerating his left Achilles. Throughout the first four home games, as part of the special promotion following the lockout, the Penguins organization gave away 52,142 fountain drinks, 33,289 nachos, 26,633 pretzels, 22,258 hot dogs, 22,118 chicken sandwiches and 20,380 hamburgers and sold at half-price 8,680 jerseys, 18,950 T-shirts and 8,776 hats. In a game against the Florida Panthers on February 22, during the third period, Evgeni Malkin was skating toward the Panthers net when he got tangled up with Panthers defenceman Erik Gudbranson and then crashed violently into the boards. Malkin went on to miss the rest of the remaining three games of February and was diagnosed with a concussion suffering from short-term memory loss and retroactively was placed on IR effective the time of initial injury. Sidney Crosby was named NHL Second Star of the Month leading the NHL with 18 assists and 24 points in the 14 games during the month and had six three-point games while obtaining at least one point in eleven of fourteen games. The Penguins lost the last game of February against ex-Penguin Jordan Staal of the Carolina Hurricanes but still finished the month with nine wins and five losses leading the Atlantic Division and second place in the Eastern Conference with twenty-six points.

March
The Penguins started out March with a wild game against the Montreal Canadiens that combined for a total of thirteen goals including the Brandon Sutter game-winner in overtime. The game featured Brandon Sutter, Matt Cooke and Chris Kunitz all scoring two goals apiece with defenceman Kris Letang finished with a career-high four assist night. After missing four games, Evgeni Malkin made his return to the lineup against the Tampa Bay Lightning on March 4 where he tallied a goal and an assist before defeating the Lightning 4–3. Chris Kunitz extended his career-long point streak to six games scoring six goals and nine points during the stretch and has at least one point in eighteen of the Penguins' last 23 games. After falling behind the Philadelphia Flyers 4–1 in the first period on March 7, and being outshot 18–4, the Penguins tied the score in the second period 4–4 outshooting the Flyers 12–3 eventually defeating the Flyers 5–4. Chris Kunitz scored twice in the game extending his career-long point streak to seven games as he and his linemates (Sidney Crosby, Pascal Dupuis) combined for three goals and eight points in the game. James Neal scored his sixteenth goal of the season thirty-six seconds into the March 9 game against the Toronto Maple Leafs but despite the early lead the Leafs tied the game and sent the game to a shootout. Marc-Andre Fleury stopped Tyler Bozak and Nazem Kadri with James Neal and Sidney Crosby scoring on James Reimer with James Neal scoring the determining goal. Chris Kunitz saw his career-long point streak end being held without a point against the Leafs. After absorbing a hit from James van Riemsdyk in the third period, Evgeni Malkin left the game with an upper-body injury and did not return.

The Penguins played the next night against the New York Islanders in an offensive showing by the Penguins defeating the Islanders 6–1. The game featured Chris Kunitz scoring his fourth career hat-trick and had a career-high five-point game, Pascal Dupuis scoring twice and Sidney Crosby finishing with five assists tying a single-game career-high. Sidney Crosby was named NHL Second Star of the Week scoring two goals, nine assists and eleven points through the week during an eight-game point streak. In a game that seemed likely to be the Penguins first game being shutout of the season, also proved to be one of the Penguins biggest come-back games of the season. After being held scoreless throughout 53:42 minutes of March 12 game against the Boston Bruins, Chris Kunitz scored with Brandon Sutter scoring twice with the game-winner coming with only 2:03 minutes left in regulation. The next game against the Toronto Maple Leafs started out the same way as the last did with the Penguins falling behind and being held off the scoreboard until 7:18 minutes of the third period. The Penguins who were behind 1–0 saw Pascal Dupuis score the tying as well as the game-winning goal with Craig Adams scoring an empty net goal with 9.4 seconds left tallying the Penguins first short-handed goal of the season defeating the Leafs 3–1. On March 16, in a game against the New York Rangers, Marc-Andre Fleury recorded a franchise all-time leading 23rd career shutout in a 3–0 victory.

The Penguins tenth straight win came on March 19 with a 2–1 win over the Washington Capitals when Matt Niskanen scored the game-winning goal late in the third period just nine seconds after the Penguins killed off a four-minute Matt Cooke penalty for boarding and unsportsmanlike conduct. On March 24 the Penguins announced that they acquired 13-year veteran and Dallas Stars captain Brenden Morrow in exchange for Joe Morrow and a 2013 fifth-round draft pick after Morrow waived his no-trade clause to play for the Penguins. Later that evening the Penguins went on to defeat the Philadelphia Flyers 2–1 in overtime extending the winning streak to 12 games surpassing the Chicago Blackhawks with the longest winning streak in the NHL this year. The next day the Penguins announced that they acquired defenceman Douglas Murray from the San Jose Sharks in exchange for a 2013 second-round draft pick and a 2014 conditional second-round draft pick. The Penguins defeated the Canadiens 1–0 on March 26 with a lone goal from Chris Kunitz in a game that featured Marc-Andre Fleury and Tomas Vokoun combining for a team shutout after Marc-Andre Fleury left that game after the second period when Tyler Kennedy and Brian Gionta got tangled up and crashed into him. The next day defenseman Kris Letang was placed on Injured Reserve and will be out 7–10 days with a lower-body injury.

In the early morning hours on March 28 the Pittsburgh Penguins announced that they had acquired 16-year veteran and Calgary Flames captain Jarome Iginla in exchange for Ben Hanowski, Kenny Agostino and a 2013 first-round draft pick after Iginla also waived his no-trade clause to play for the Penguins. That evening the Penguins went on to defeat the Winnipeg Jets 4–0 which featured Evgeni Malkin making his return to the lineup after missing nine games and goaltender Tomas Vokoun recording his 50th career shutout extending the Penguins winning streak to 14 games. Jarome Iginla filled an immigration petition and was approved to join the team on March 29 in time to be added to the starting line-up against the New York Islanders. The Penguins went on to defeat the Islanders extending the winning streak to 15 games and became the first team in league history to have a perfect record over a calendar month. The Penguins also set a franchise record for longest shutout streak of 208:24 minutes and Vokoun setting a personal and Penguins record for an individual shutout streak with 162:42 minutes. The win came with a price after 50 seconds into his first shift, Sidney Crosby left the game after a shot from Brooks Orpik was deflected and re-directed into his mouth. The next day, head coach Dan Bylsma announced that Sidney Crosby needed to have oral surgery as a result of the injury and was out indefinitely with a broken jaw. Defenseman Paul Martin also underwent surgery on a broken bone in his hand and is projected to miss 4–6 weeks.

April

The Penguins history-making streak came to an end Tuesday night, April 2, 2013, at the hands of the Buffalo Sabres. The team honored Brooks Orpik who played his 622nd game as a Penguin the most games played ever in franchise history by a defenseman. On the day of the NHL trade deadline, April 3, 2013, the Pittsburgh Penguins acquired forward Jussi Jokinen from the Carolina Hurricanes in exchange for a conditional sixth or seventh round draft pick in 2013 with Carolina retaining a portion of Jokinen's salary. 
The Penguins that night went on to drop the second game in a row losing against the New York Rangers. The next game the Penguins beat the Rangers in a game which featured Jussi Jokinen making his Penguin debut and scoring the game-tying and game-winning goal in a shootout. James Neal left the game halfway through the third period after Rangers defenseman Michael Del Zotto turned and caught Neal with an elbow up high and did not return the rest of the game. Neal was later diagnosed with a concussion and would miss the upcoming road-trip with no timetable for his return given while Kris Letang, who missed the last five games, was cleared for team practice. The Penguins defeated the Carolina Hurricanes the next night, 5–3, securing themselves a playoff position. Kris Letang returned to the lineup the next game and defenseman Tanner Glass scored his first goal as a Penguin helping the Penguins defeat the Tampa Bay Lightning 6–3. Evgeni Malkin missed the next game against the Florida Panthers and was later classified as day-to-day due to an upper-body injury. The next game against the Montreal Canadiens, defenseman Douglas Murray scored a goal which ended the longest goalless streak in the NHL of 146 games helping the Penguins defeat the Canadiens 6–4.

The game scheduled against the Boston Bruins on April 19, 2013 was postponed to April 20, 2013 due to the city of Boston being placed in a state of lock-down while authorities searched the areas for the suspects from the Boston Marathon bombing. The game originally scheduled on April 20, 2013 against the Buffalo Sabres was moved to April 23, 2013 with all tickets for the original game being honored for the rescheduled game. The Penguins went to defeat the Boston Bruins and solidified their spot as the number one seed in the Eastern Conference. The Penguins honored the lives lost and the town of Boston by wearing a special patch on their jerseys with the outline of Boston's downtown with an American flag in the background and the numbers "617" – which is the Boston area code. After the game the jerseys were auctioned off with the proceeds being donated to "The One Fund Boston". The Penguins next win over that Ottawa Senators featured Tomas Vokoun reach his 300th career win in his 700th career game and Dan Bylsma became the fastest coach in NHL history to reach 200 wins (316 games). Evgeni Malkin returned to the line up after missing the last four games but failed to defeat the Buffalo Sabres. Brooks Orpik also left the game after the first period and did not return from a lower-body injury. The Penguins then went on to lose a their last regular season away game against the New Jersey Devils 3–2. The Penguins finished off the last game of the regular season with a home game against the Carolina Hurricanes which featured the return of Jordan Staal to the city of Pittsburgh. In the game's first television timeout, a highlight reel containing some of Staal's best moments as a Penguin aired on the jumbotron. After the video package ended, Staal received a standing ovation. The Penguins defeated the Hurrincanes 8–3.

The Penguins led the League in scoring for the second consecutive year, scoring 162 goals overall (excluding 3 shootout-winning goals). The Penguins also scored at least one goal in all of their 48 regular-season games.

Schedule and results

|-  style="background:#cfc;"
| 1 || 19 || 3:00 pm || Pittsburgh Penguins || 3–1 || Philadelphia Flyers || Wells Fargo Center (19,994) || 1–0–0 || 2
|-  style="background:#cfc;"
| 2 || 20 || 7:00 pm || Pittsburgh Penguins || 6–3 || New York Rangers || Madison Square Garden (17,200) || 2–0–0 || 4
|-  style="background:#fcf;"
| 3 || 23 || 7:00 pm || Toronto Maple Leafs || 5–2 || Pittsburgh Penguins || Consol Energy Center (18,641) || 2–1–0 || 4
|-  style="background:#fcf;"
| 4 || 25 || 8:00 pm || Pittsburgh Penguins || 2–4 || Winnipeg Jets || MTS Centre (15,004) || 2–2–0 || 4
|-  style="background:#cfc;"
| 5 || 27 || 5:00 pm || Pittsburgh Penguins || 2–1 SO || Ottawa Senators || Scotiabank Place (20,081) || 3–2–0 || 6
|-  style="background:#fcf;"
| 6 || 29 || 7:30 pm || New York Islanders || 4–1 || Pittsburgh Penguins || Consol Energy Center (18,657) || 3–3–0 || 6
|-  style="background:#cfc;"
| 7 || 31 || 7:00 pm || Pittsburgh Penguins || 3–0 || New York Rangers || Madison Square Garden (17,200) || 4–3–0 || 8
|-

|-  style="background:#cfc;"
| 8 || 2 || 1:00 pm || New Jersey Devils || 1–5 || Pittsburgh Penguins || Consol Energy Center (18,635) || 5–3–0 || 10
|-  style="background:#cfc;"
| 9 || 3 || 12:30 pm || Pittsburgh Penguins || 6–3 || Washington Capitals || Verizon Center (18,506) || 6–3–0 || 12
|-  style="background:#cfc;"
| 10 || 5 || 7:00 pm || Pittsburgh Penguins || 4–2 || New York Islanders || Nassau Coliseum (11,318) || 7–3–0 || 14
|-  style="background:#cfc;"
| 11 || 7 || 7:00 pm || Washington Capitals || 2–5 || Pittsburgh Penguins || Consol Energy Center (18,650) || 8–3–0 || 16
|-  style="background:#fcf;"
| 12 || 9 || 1:00 pm || Pittsburgh Penguins || 1–3 || New Jersey Devils || Prudential Center (17,625) || 8–4–0 || 16
|-  style="background:#fcf;"
| 13 || 10 || 7:30 pm || New Jersey Devils || 3–1 || Pittsburgh Penguins || Consol Energy Center (18,658) || 8–5–0 || 16
|-  style="background:#cfc;"
| 14 || 13 || 7:00 pm || Ottawa Senators || 2–4 || Pittsburgh Penguins || Consol Energy Center (18,637) || 9–5–0 || 18
|-  style="background:#cfc;"
| 15 || 15 || 7:00 pm || Pittsburgh Penguins || 3–1 || Winnipeg Jets || MTS Centre (15,004) || 10–5–0 || 20
|-  style="background:#cfc;"
| 16 || 17 || 12:30 pm || Pittsburgh Penguins || 4–3 || Buffalo Sabres || First Niagara Center (19,070) || 11–5–0 || 22
|-  style="background:#fcf;"
| 17 || 20 || 7:30 pm || Philadelphia Flyers || 6–5 || Pittsburgh Penguins || Consol Energy Center (18,650) || 11–6–0 || 22
|-  style="background:#cfc;"
| 18 || 22 || 7:00 pm || Florida Panthers || 1–3 || Pittsburgh Penguins || Consol Energy Center (18,655) || 12–6–0 || 24
|-  style="background:#cfc;"
| 19 || 24 || 7:30 pm || Tampa Bay Lightning || 3–5 || Pittsburgh Penguins || Consol Energy Center (18,632) || 13–6–0 || 26
|-  style="background:#fcf;"
| 20 || 26 || 7:30 pm || Pittsburgh Penguins || 4–6 || Florida Panthers || BB&T Center (17,378) || 13–7–0 || 26
|-  style="background:#fcf;"
| 21 || 28 || 7:00 pm || Pittsburgh Penguins || 1–4 || Carolina Hurricanes || PNC Arena (18,680) || 13–8–0 || 26
|-

|-  style="background:#cfc;"
| 22 || 2 || 7:00 pm || Pittsburgh Penguins || 7–6 OT || Montreal Canadiens || Bell Centre (21,273) || 14–8–0 || 28
|-  style="background:#cfc;"
| 23 || 4 || 7:30 pm || Tampa Bay Lightning || 3–4 || Pittsburgh Penguins || Consol Energy Center (18,656) || 15–8–0 || 30
|-  style="background:#cfc;"
| 24 || 7 || 7:00 pm || Pittsburgh Penguins || 5–4 || Philadelphia Flyers || Wells Fargo Center (19,997) || 16–8–0 || 32
|-  style="background:#cfc;"
| 25 || 9 || 7:00 pm || Pittsburgh Penguins || 5–4 SO || Toronto Maple Leafs || Air Canada Centre (19,418) || 17–8–0 || 34
|-  style="background:#cfc;"
| 26 || 10 || 7:00 pm || New York Islanders || 1–6 || Pittsburgh Penguins || Consol Energy Center (18,634) || 18–8–0 || 36
|-  style="background:#cfc;"
| 27 || 12 || 7:30 pm || Boston Bruins || 2–3 || Pittsburgh Penguins || Consol Energy Center (18,640) || 19–8–0 || 38
|-  style="background:#cfc;"
| 28 || 14 || 7:00 pm || Pittsburgh Penguins || 3–1 || Toronto Maple Leafs || Air Canada Centre (19,561) || 20–8–0 || 40
|-  style="background:#cfc;"
| 29 || 16 || 1:00 pm || New York Rangers || 0–3 || Pittsburgh Penguins || Consol Energy Center (18,658) || 21–8–0 || 42
|-  style="background:#cfc;"
| 30 || 17 || 12:30 pm || Boston Bruins || 1–2 || Pittsburgh Penguins || Consol Energy Center (18,659) || 22–8–0 || 44
|-  style="background:#cfc;"
| 31 || 19 || 7:30 pm || Washington Capitals || 1–2 || Pittsburgh Penguins || Consol Energy Center (18,653) || 23–8–0 || 46
|-  style="background:#cfc;"
| 32 || 22 || 7:00 pm || Pittsburgh Penguins || 4–2 || New York Islanders || Nassau Coliseum (14,888) || 24–8–0 || 48
|-  style="background:#cfc;"
| 33 || 24 || 7:30 pm || Philadelphia Flyers || 1–2 OT || Pittsburgh Penguins || Consol Energy Center (18,662) || 25–8–0 || 50
|-  style="background:#cfc;"
| 34 || 26 || 7:00 pm || Montreal Canadiens || 0–1 || Pittsburgh Penguins || Consol Energy Center (18,646) || 26–8–0 || 52
|-  style="background:#cfc;"
| 35 || 28 || 7:00 pm || Winnipeg Jets || 0–4 || Pittsburgh Penguins || Consol Energy Center (18,649) || 27–8–0 || 54
|-  style="background:#cfc;"
| 36 || 30 || 1:00 pm || New York Islanders || 0–2 || Pittsburgh Penguins || Consol Energy Center (18,673) || 28–8–0 || 56
|-

|-  style="background:#fcf;"
| 37 || 2 || 7:30 pm || Buffalo Sabres || 4–1 || Pittsburgh Penguins || Consol Energy Center (18,642) || 28–9–0 || 56
|-  style="background:#fcf;"
| 38 || 3 || 7:30 pm || Pittsburgh Penguins || 1–6 || New York Rangers || Madison Square Garden (17,200) || 28–10–0 || 56
|-  style="background:#cfc;"
| 39 || 5 || 7:00 pm || New York Rangers || 1–2 SO || Pittsburgh Penguins || Consol Energy Center (18,659) || 29–10–0 || 58
|-  style="background:#cfc;"
| 40 || 9 || 7:00 pm || Pittsburgh Penguins || 5–3 || Carolina Hurricanes || PNC Arena (17,168) || 30–10–0 || 60
|-  style="background:#cfc;"
| 41 || 11 || 7:30 pm || Pittsburgh Penguins || 6–3 || Tampa Bay Lightning || Tampa Bay Times Forum (19,204) || 31–10–0 || 62
|-  style="background:#cfc;"
| 42 || 13 || 7:30 pm || Pittsburgh Penguins || 3–1 || Florida Panthers || BB&T Center (18,891) || 32–10–0 || 64
|-  style="background:#cfc;"
| 43 || 17 || 7:00 pm || Montreal Canadiens || 4–6 || Pittsburgh Penguins || Consol Energy Center (18,626) || 33–10–0 || 66
|-  style="background:#ccc;"
| – || 19 || 7:00 pm ||colspan="6" | Game against Boston rescheduled to April 20 due to manhunt for Boston Marathon bombing suspect. 
|-  style="background:#cfc;"
| 44 || 20 || 12:30 pm || Pittsburgh Penguins || 3–2 || Boston Bruins || TD Garden (17,565) || 34–10–0 || 68
|-  style="background:#ccc;"
| – || 20 || 7:00 pm ||colspan="6" | Game against Buffalo rescheduled to April 23 due to Bruins game being rescheduled to April 20.
|-  style="background:#cfc;"
| 45 || 22 || 7:30 pm || Pittsburgh Penguins || 3–1 || Ottawa Senators || Scotiabank Place (20,276) || 35–10–0 || 70
|-  style="background:#fcf;"
| 46 || 23 || 7:30 pm || Buffalo Sabres || 4–2 || Pittsburgh Penguins || Consol Energy Center (18,630) || 35–11–0 || 70
|-  style="background:#fcf;"
| 47 || 25 || 7:00 pm || Pittsburgh Penguins || 2–3 || New Jersey Devils || Prudential Center (16,122) || 35–12–0 || 70
|-  style="background:#cfc;"
| 48 || 27 || 7:00 pm || Carolina Hurricanes || 3–8 || Pittsburgh Penguins || Consol Energy Center (18,658) || 36–12–0 || 72
|-

|- style="text-align:center;"
| Legend:       = Win       = Loss       = OT/SO LossAlternate Jersey

Season standings

Detailed records 
Final

Injuries

Stanley Cup playoffs

Eastern Conference Quarterfinals
The Penguins started the 2013 Stanley Cup playoffs in the first seed of the Eastern Conference facing the #8 seed the New York Islanders. The Penguins defeated the Islanders four games out of five that they faced each other during the regular season, outscoring the Islanders 17–9. The Penguins dominated Game 1 with a score of 5–0 which marked Marc-Andre Fleury's sixth career playoff shutout tying a franchise record and rookie Beau Bennett's first career postseason goal on the first shift of his first game. Sidney Crosby made his return in Game 2 after missing the past 13 games (12 regular season, one playoff) but after taking an early lead the Penguins lost Game 2, 3–4. The Penguins went on to win Game 3 at the 8:44 mark of overtime when Chris Kunitz scored a power-play goal defeating the Islanders 5–4. James Neal opened the scoring in Game 3 after missing the last two games with a lower-body injury but the Penguins lost 6–4 with the Islanders tying the series at two games apiece. Tomas Vokoun replaced Marc-Andre Fleury for Game 5 and also saw the return of Tyler Kennedy and Joe Vitale with Kennedy scoring the game-winning goal in a 4–0 shutout victory taking the lead in the series. Game 6 saw the Penguins behind 3–2 towards the end of regulation when Paul Martin tied the game with 5:17 left in regulation. Unlikely hero, Brooks Orpik scored his first career playoff goal in 78 playoff games defeating the Islanders 4–3 and advancing the Penguins onto the Eastern Conference Semi-finals.

Eastern Conference Semi-finals
The Penguins opened the Semi-finals against the seventh-seeded the Ottawa Senators, a team that the Penguins defeated in all three meetings during the regular season, outscoring them 9–4. The Penguins defeated the Senators in Game 1, 4–1, in a physical game that saw a total of 66 hits (40 Penguins, 26 Senators). The Penguins chased goaltender Craig Anderson just 1:15 into the second period of Game 2 after Sidney Crosby's slap shot beat Anderson, with Crosby becoming just the second Penguins player other than Mario Lemieux to notch multiple post-season hat-tricks. With less than a minute to play in regulation of Game 3 and the Penguins on a power-play, the Senators pulled their goaltender for the extra attacker, where captain Daniel Alfredsson scored a shorthanded goal to tie the game with 28.6 seconds left. Game 3 went into double-overtime and 7:39 minutes into the second overtime period, Colin Greening scored on a rebound to give the Senators a 2–1 victory, bringing the series to 2–1. Jarome Iginla and James Neal both scored two goals apiece in Game 4, with the Penguins defeating the Senators 7–3, pushing the Senators to the risk of elimination and bringing the series to a 3–1 score. James Neal added three more goals in Game 5 to record his first career playoff hat-trick, and his fifth goal in the last six periods, eliminating the Senators with a 6–2 win and advancing the Penguins to the Conference Finals. The Penguins outscored the Senators 22–11 and defeated Craig Anderson, who finished the regular season with a 1.69 GAA and a 0.941 save percentage over 24 games but finished the playoffs with a 3.01 GAA and a 0.918 save percentage over ten games total and allowed 20 goals over the five games against the Penguins.

Eastern Conference Finals
The Penguins faced the fourth-seeded Boston Bruins in the Conference Finals, the fifth time the two franchises faced off in a playoff series, and the third time in the Eastern Conference Finals. Their most recent meeting was in the 1992 Wales Conference Finals, where Pittsburgh swept the Bruins out of the playoffs. The Penguins had won all three games in this year's regular season series, all three games by one goal. The Pittsburgh Penguins had made it to their third Conference Finals since 2008, while the Boston Bruins were making their second appearance in three years.

The Bruins swept the top seeded Penguins, as Boston goaltender Tuukka Rask recorded his first two career playoff shutouts and only allowed two Pittsburgh goals in the entire series. Penguin stars Evgeni Malkin, Sidney Crosby and the newly acquired Jarome Iginla were held to zero combined points during the series. David Krejci had two goals in the Bruins' 3–0 Game 1 victory, the Bruins recorded six goals in a 6–1 rout in Game 2, Patrice Bergeron scored at 15:19 of the second overtime period of Game 3 to give Boston a 2–1 win, and in Game 4, Adam McQuaid scored the lone goal to give the Bruins a 1–0 win and a trip to the Stanley Cup Finals. This series marked the first time since 1979 that the Penguins were swept in a playoff series; notably, it was the same Bruins franchise that swept the Penguins that year.

Playoff log

|-  style="background:#cfc;"
| 1 || May 1 || 7:30 pm || New York Islanders || 0–5 || Pittsburgh Penguins ||  || Bennett, Dupuis, Letang, Dupuis, Glass || None || Fleury (1–0) || Consol Energy Center (18,612) || Pit leads 1–0 
|-  style="background:#fcf;"
| 2 || May 3 || 7:00 pm || New York Islanders || 4–3 || Pittsburgh Penguins || || Malkin, Crosby, Crosby || Moulson, McDonald, Martin, Okposo || Nabokov (1–1) || Consol Energy Center (18,624) || Series Tied 1–1 
|-  style="background:#cfc;"
| 3 || May 5 || 12:00 pm || Pittsburgh Penguins || 5–4 || New York Islanders || OT || Iginla, Kunitz, Dupuis, Murray, Kunitz || Moulson, Cizikas, Okposo, Tavares || Fleury (2–1) || Nassau Veterans Memorial Coliseum (16,170) || Pit leads 2–1 
|-  style="background:#fcf;"
| 4 || May 7 || 7:00 pm || Pittsburgh Penguins || 4–6 || New York Islanders || || Neal, Malkin, Sutter, Dupuis || Strait, Streit, Okposo, Streit, Tavares, Cizikas || Nabokov (2–2) || Nassau Coliseum (16,170) || Series Tied 2–2 
|-  style="background:#cfc;"
| 5 || May 9 || 7:00 pm || New York Islanders || 0–4 || Pittsburgh Penguins || || Kennedy, Murray, Crosby, Letang || None || Vokoun (1–0) || Consol Energy Center (18,636) || Pit leads 3–2
|-  style="background:#cff;"
| 6 || May 11 || 7:00 pm || Pittsburgh Penguins || 4–3 || New York Islanders || OT || Iginla, Dupuis, Martin, Orpik || Tavares, McDonald, Grabner || Vokoun (2–0) || Nassau Coliseum (16,170) || Pit Wins 4–2
|-

|-  style="background:#cfc;"
| 1 || May 14 || 7:30 pm || Ottawa Senators || 1–4 || Pittsburgh Penguins ||  || Martin, Malkin, Kunitz, Dupuis || Greening || Vokoun (3–0) || Consol Energy Center (18,621) || Pit leads 1–0
|-  style="background:#cfc;"
| 2 || May 17 || 7:30 pm || Ottawa Senators || 3–4 || Pittsburgh Penguins ||  || Crosby, Crosby, Crosby, Morrow || Turris, Greening, Pageau || Vokoun (4–0) || Consol Energy Center (18,645) || Pit leads 2–0
|-  style="background:#fcf;"
| 3 || May 19 || 7:30 pm || Pittsburgh Penguins || 1–2 || Ottawa Senators || 2OT || Kennedy || Alfredsson, Greening || Anderson (5–2)  || Scotiabank Place (20,500) || Pit leads 2–1
|-  style="background:#cfc;"
| 4 || May 22 || 7:30 pm || Pittsburgh Penguins || 7–3 || Ottawa Senators ||  || Neal, Kunitz, Iginla, Neal, Dupuis, Crosby, Iginla || Michalek, Turris, Alfredsson || Vokoun (5–1) || Scotiabank Place (20,500) || Pit leads 3–1
|-  style="background:#cff;"
| 5 || May 24 || 7:30 pm || Ottawa Senators || 2–6 || Pittsburgh Penguins ||  || Morrow, Neal, Letang, Malkin, Neal, Neal || Michalek, Turris || Vokoun (6–1) || Consol Energy Center (18,656) || Pit Wins 4–1
|-

|-  style="background:#fcf;"
| 1 || Jun 1 || 8:00 pm || Boston Bruins || 3–0 || Pittsburgh Penguins ||  || None || Krejci, Krejci, Horton || Rask (9–4) || Consol Energy Center (18,628) || BOS leads 1–0 
|-  style="background:#fcf;"
| 2 || Jun 3 || 8:00 pm || Boston Bruins || 6–1 || Pittsburgh Penguins || || Sutter || Marchand, Horton, Krejci, Marchand, Bergeron, Boychuk || Rask (10–4) || Consol Energy Center (18,619) || BOS leads 2–0
|-  style="background:#fcf;"
| 3 || Jun 5 || 8:00 pm || Pittsburgh Penguins || 1–2 || Boston Bruins || 2OT || Kunitz || Krejci, Bergeron || Rask (11–4) || TD Garden (17,565) || BOS leads 3–0 
|-  style="background:#fcf;"
| 4 || Jun 7 || 8:00 pm || Pittsburgh Penguins || 0–1 || Boston Bruins ||  || None || McQuaid || Rask (12–4) || TD Garden (17,565) || BOS wins 4–0
|-

|- 
| Legend:       = Win       = Loss       = Playoff series win      Bold = Game Winning Goal

Injuries

Player statistics
Final
Skaters

  Team Total includes Skater Statistics, Goaltender Statistics and Bench Minor Penalties.

Goaltenders

†Denotes player spent time with another team before joining the Penguins.  Stats reflect time with the Penguins only.
‡Denotes player was traded mid-season.  Stats reflect time with the Team only.
Bold/italics denotes franchise record.

Notable achievements

Awards

Team awards
Awarded on April 24, 2013

Milestones

Transactions
The Penguins have been involved in the following transactions during the 2012–13 season:

Trades

Free agents

Waivers

Signings

Other

Notes
  – Two-way contract
  – Entry-level contract

Draft picks

Pittsburgh Penguins' picks at the 2012 NHL Entry Draft, held in Pittsburgh, Pennsylvania on June 22 & 23, 2012.

Draft notes 
 The Carolina Hurricanes' first-round pick went to the Pittsburgh Penguins as a result of a June 22, 2012, trade that sent Jordan Staal to the Hurricanes in exchange for Brandon Sutter, Brian Dumoulin and this pick.
 The Phoenix Coyotes' third-round pick (originally Philadelphia Flyers' pick) went to the Pittsburgh Penguins as a result of a June 22, 2012, trade that sent Zbynek Michalek to the Coyotes in exchange for Harrison Ruopp, Marc Cheverie and this pick.
 The Columbus Blue Jackets' fourth-round pick went to the Pittsburgh Penguins as a result of a November 8, 2011, trade that sent Mark Letestu to the Blue Jackets in exchange for this pick.
 The Pittsburgh Penguins' seventh-round pick went to the Washington Capitals as the result of a June 4, 2012, trade that sent Tomas Vokoun to the Penguins in exchange for this pick.

See also 
 2012–13 NHL season
 2012–13 NHL transactions

References 

Pittsburgh Penguins seasons
Pittsburgh Penguins season, 2012-13
P
Pitts
Pitts